Jean-Pierre Sydler (1921-1988) was a Swiss mathematician and a librarian, well known for his work in geometry, most notably on Hilbert's third problem.

Biography 
Sydler was born in 1921 in Neuchâtel, Switzerland. He graduated from ETH Zürich in 1943 and received a doctorate in 1947.  In 1950 he became a librarian at the ETH while continuing to publish mathematical papers in his spare time. In 1960 he received a prize of the Danish Academy of Sciences for his work on scissors congruence.  In 1963 he became a director of the ETH library and pioneered the use of automatisation.  He continued serving as a director until the retirement in 1986. He died in 1988 in Zürich.

References 
 Greg N. Frederickson, Dissections: Plane and Fancy, Cambridge University Press, 2003.

External links 

1921 births
1988 deaths
People from Neuchâtel
ETH Zurich alumni
20th-century  Swiss  mathematicians
Swiss librarians